Boris Ivanovich Aristov (Борис Иванович Аристов) (13 September 1925, Kostroma – 27 November 2018, Moscow) was a Soviet politician and diplomat who served as Soviet Ambassador to Finland (1988–1992) and Poland (1978–1983), Soviet Minister of Foreign Trade (1985–1988).

References

1925 births
2018 deaths
Recipients of the Order of Lenin
Recipients of the Order of the Red Banner of Labour
Soviet politicians
People's commissars and ministers of the Soviet Union
Ambassadors of the Soviet Union to Finland 
Ambassadors of the Soviet Union to Poland